Matteo Figoli (born 17 December 2000) is an professional footballer who plays as a midfielder for  club Pergolettese.

Club career
Born in Sarzana, Figoli starter his career in Spezia youth sector. He was promoted to the first team in 2018.

On 19 July 2019, he was loaned to Serie C club Pianese. He made his professional debut on 25 August 2019 against Pro Vercelli.

On 17 August 2020, he joined Pergolettese on loan.

For the 2021–22 season, he was loaned to Carrarese.

On 19 July 2022, Figoli returned to Pergolettese on a two-year contract.

References

External links
 
 

2000 births
Living people
People from Sarzana
Footballers from Liguria
Italian footballers
Association football midfielders
Serie C players
Spezia Calcio players
U.S. Pianese players
U.S. Pergolettese 1932 players
Carrarese Calcio players
Sportspeople from the Province of La Spezia